The 2019 IIHF World U18 Championship Division III was an international ice hockey tournament run by the International Ice Hockey Federation.

The Group A tournament was held in Sofia, Bulgaria from 25 to 31 March and the Group B tournament was held in Cape Town, South Africa from 9 to 12 April 2019. Luxembourg made their debut in the World Championships.

Group A

Participants

Match officials
4 referees and 7 linesmen are selected for the tournament.

Standings

Results
All times are local (UTC+2).

Awards
Best Players Selected by the Directorate
 Goaltender:  Artem Loginov
 Defenceman:  Nino Tomov
 Forward:  İsmet Gökçen
Source: IIHF

Group B

Participants

Match officials
3 referees and 4 linesmen are selected for the tournament.

Standings

Results
All times are local (UTC+2).

Awards

Best Players Selected by the Directorate

 Goaltender:   Hsiao Po-Yu
 Defenceman:  David Church
 Forward:  Ryan Chu

Source: IIHF

References

IIHF World U18 Championship Division III
2019 IIHF World U18 Championships
International ice hockey competitions hosted by Bulgaria
International ice hockey competitions hosted by South Africa
2018–19 in Bulgarian ice hockey
IIHF
IIHF
Sports competitions in Sofia
Sports competitions in Cape Town